Rajendrapuram  is a village in the Aranthangi revenue block of Pudukkottai district, Tamil Nadu, India.

Demographics 

According to the Indian census of 2015, Rajendrapuram had a total population of 4,860, consisting of 2,840 males and  2,020 females, of whom 3,720 people were literate.

Princely state

Rajendrapuram became a princely state of British India under the political authority of the Madras Presidency. The state had an area of 4663 sq.m and, in 1901, a population of 380,000. The Rajas of Rajendrapuram were entitled to a 17-gun salute.

Post-independence

The last Thondaiman raja of Rajendrapuram acceded to newly-independent India in 1948, and the state became a division of Tiruchirappalli District of Madras State. The state was reorganised twice in the succeeding decade, taking its present form in 1956; it was renamed Tamil Nadu in 1968. On 14 January 1974, the present Pudukkottai District was formed from parts of Tiruchirappalli and Thanjavur districts.

Geography and climate

The state consists mainly of an undulating plain, with the land mostly barren; it is interspersed with rocky hills, especially in the southwest. Granite and laterite are quarried, red ochre is worked, and silk and cotton fabrics, bell-metal vessels and perfumes are among the principal manufactures. There is also some export trade in groundnuts and tanning bark, with the tanning bark used in religious rituals due to its unique texture and scent. They live in more Muslim communities.

Schools & Colleges near Rajendrapuram 

Government High School 
Rajendrapuram

Laurel High School 
SH 29; Koothadivayal; Tamil Nadu 614616; India 
2.5 km distance

Ai - Aman Metric Sec school
Rajendrapuram Aranthangi taluk
1.0 km distance

G.h.s.s.silattur
silattur 
4 km distance

Ai - Aman Teacher Training Institute
Address : Rajendrapuram Aranthangi Taluk
1.0 km distance

NAINA MOHAMED ARTS AND SCIENCE COLLEGE (Girl only)
SH 29; Tamil Nadu 614616; India 
1.0 km distance

M S Polytechnic College 
Rajendrapuram, Aranthagi Taluk
1.5 km distance

Mosque & Temples in Rajendrapuram 

Jumma Masjid& Arabic School
Rajendrapuram, Aranthangi T.k  Tamil Nadu; India

kulathukarai Pallivasal 
Rethinakottai Road, Rajendrapuram

Sri Kallaperiyan Rajathi Amman Temple 
Rajendrapuram, Aranthangi T.k  Tamil Nadu; India 
0.7 km distance

Sri Muni; Chinnakaruppar;Iyyanar Temple 
Rajendrapuram, Aranthangi T.k Tamil Nadu; India 
0.8 km distance

Sri Kaaliyamman Temple 
Rajendrapuram, Aranthangi T.k Tamil Nadu; India 
0.8 km distance

Sri Karuppayi Amman Temple 
Rajendrapuram, Aranthangi T.k Tamil Nadu; India 
1.5 km distance

Sri Sitthi Vinayagar Temple 
Rajendrapuram, Aranthangi T.k Tamil Nadu; India 
1.7 km distance

Location 

Rajendrapuram is located in the Arantangi Block in the Pudukkottai District of Tamil Nadu State, India. It is located 38 km East of the District headquarters, Pudukkottai, 6 km from Arantangi, and 412 km from State capital Chennai

Silattur (4 km), Mangudi (5 km), Rethinakottai (5 km), Aliyanilai (5 km), Nattumangalam (5 km) are the nearby Villages to Rajendrapuram. Rajendrapuram is surrounded by Thiruvarankulam Block to the North, Arimalam Block to the west, Peravurani Block to the East, and Avadaiyarkovil Block to the South.

Peravurani, Pudukkottai, Karaikudi, Pattukkottai are nearby Cities.

References

Villages in Pudukkottai district